Archery at the 1972 Summer Olympics consisted of two medal events, one for men and one for women.

Each event was composed of two FITA rounds.  Each of those FITA rounds consisted of the archers shooting 36 arrows at targets at 4 different distances, for a total of 144 arrows.  The distances were 90, 70, 50, and 30 metres for men and 70, 60, 50, and 30 metres for women. 18 nations competed in both the men's and women's events, while 3 competed in only the women's and 6 competed only in the men's.

Medal summary

Events

Medal table

Participating nations

References

External links
Official Olympic Report

 
1972
1972 Summer Olympics events
1972 in archery